Stanhopea martiana is a species of orchid endemic to southwestern Mexico.

References

External links 
 
 

martiana
Endemic orchids of Mexico
Flora of Mexico